is a passenger railway station in the city of Yūki, Ibaraki Prefecture, Japan, operated by East Japan Railway Company (JR East).

Lines
Higashi-Yūki Station is served by the Mito Line, and is located 8.3 km from the official starting point of the line at Oyama Station.

Station layout
Higashi-Yūki Station consists of a single side platform serving traffic in both directions. There is no station building, and the station is unattended.

History
Higashi-Yūki Station was opened on 1 December 1937.  The station was absorbed into the JR East network upon the privatization of the Japanese National Railways (JNR) on 1 April 1987.

Surrounding area

See also
 List of railway stations in Japan

External links

  JR East Station Information 

Railway stations in Ibaraki Prefecture
Mito Line
Railway stations in Japan opened in 1937
Yūki, Ibaraki